The 2017–18 season is Maccabi Haifa's 60th season in Israeli Premier League, and their 36th consecutive season in the top division of Israeli football.

Club

Kits

 Provider: Nike, Inc.
 Main Sponsor: Honda
 Secondary Sponsor:  Pointer and Variety Israel

Squad information

Current coaching staff
{|class="wikitable"
|+
! style="background-color:#FFFFFF; color:#000000;" scope="col"|Position
! style="background-color:#FFFFFF; color:#000000;" scope="col"|Staff
|-

Transfers

In

Out

Pre-season and friendlies

Competitions

Overall

Overview

Ligat Ha'Al

Regular season

Regular season table

Results overview

Play-off

Relegation round table

Results overview

Results summary

Results by round

State Cup

Round of 32

Round of 16

Quarter final 

3-3 on aggregate. Hapoel Haifa won on away goals.

Toto Cup

Group stage

Quarter-final

Semi-final

Statistics

Squad statistics

Updated on 15 May 2018

Goals

Updated on 7 May 2018

Clean sheets

Updated on 14 May 2018

Disciplinary record (Ligat Ha'Al and State Cup)

Updated on 14 May 2018

Disciplinary record (Toto Cup)

Updated on 9 February 2018

Suspensions

Updated on Updated on 7 February 2018

Overall

{| class="wikitable" style="text-align: center"
|-
!
!Total
!Home
!Away
!Natural
|-
|align=left| Games played          || 43 || 22 || 20 || 1
|-
|align=left| Games won             || 13 || 9 || 4 || 0
|- 
|align=left| Games drawn           || 14 || 6 || 8 || 0
|-
|align=left| Games lost             || 16 || 7 || 8 || 1
|-
|align=left| Biggest win             || 4-0 vs Hapoel Ironi Kiryat Shmona 4-0 vs Hapoel Akko  ||  4-0 vs Hapoel Ironi Kiryat Shmona 4-0 vs Hapoel Akko || 4-1 vs Bnei Sakhnin 4-1 Hapoel Haifa 3-0 Hapoel Ra'anana || -
|-
|align=left| Biggest loss       || 0-3 vs Hapoel Haifa || 0-3 vs Hapoel Haifa || 0-2 vs Bnei Yehuda Tel Aviv 0-2 vs Hapoel Akko  0-2 Hapoel Be'er Sheva 1-3 Beitar Jerusalem  || 0-1 Hapoel Be'er Sheva
|-
|align=left| Biggest win (League)    ||  4-0 vs Hapoel Ironi Kiryat Shmona 4-0 vs Hapoel Akko ||  4-0 vs Hapoel Ironi Kiryat Shmona 4-0 vs Hapoel Akko || 3-0 Hapoel Ra'anana || -
|-
|align=left| Biggest loss (League)   || 0-3 vs Hapoel Haifa || 0-3 vs Hapoel Haifa || 0-2 vs Bnei Yehuda Tel Aviv 0-2 vs Hapoel Akko  0-2 Hapoel Be'er Sheva 1-3 Beitar Jerusalem  || -
|-
|align=left| Biggest win (Cup)    ||  3-0 Maccabi Tel Aviv ||  3-0 Maccabi Tel Aviv || - || -
|-
|align=left| Biggest loss (Cup)     || - || - || - || -
|-
|align=left| Biggest win (Toto)    || 4-1 vs Bnei Sakhnin 4-1 Hapoel Haifa || - || 4-1 vs Bnei Sakhnin 4-1 Hapoel Haifa || -
|-
|align=left| Biggest loss (Toto)   || 0-1 Hapoel Be'er Sheva || - || - || 0-1 Hapoel Be'er Sheva
|-
|align=left| Goals scored           || 57 || 37 || 20 || 0
|-
|align=left| Goals conceded         || 50 || 27 || 22 || 1
|-
|align=left| Goal difference        || +7 || +10 || -2 || -1
|-
|align=left| Clean sheets            || 12 || 7 || 5 || -
|-
|--
|-
|align=left| Yellow cards          || 84 || 42 || 39 || 3
|-
|align=left| Red cards               || 2 || 1 || 1 || -
|-
|align=left| Most appearances      ||colspan=4| -
|-
|align=left| Most minutes played   || colspan=4| -
|-
|align=left| Most goals        || colspan=4| Nikita Rukavytsya (15)
|-
|align=left|Penalties for   || 6 || 1 || 5 || -
|-
|align=left|Penalties against   || 6 || 1 || 5 || -
|-
|align=left| Winning rate         || % || % || % || % 
|-

References

External links
 Maccabi Haifa website

Maccabi Haifa F.C. seasons
Maccabi Haifa